The Sun Life Centre in Toronto, Ontario (also known as 150 King Street West) was built in 1984 to house the Toronto operations of Sun Life Financial, serving as the insurance company's global headquarters until 2017. The Sun Life Financial Tower is known as an architectural symbol of modernism, located in the heart of Toronto's financial district at 150 King Street West.

Construction of the stainless steel and glass high-rise structure was completed in 1984 and was originally developed to house the head office of Sun Life 9, now Sun Life Financial.

Toronto's Sun Life Centre/150 King W. complex should not be mistaken for the Sun Life Building in Montreal, the original global headquarters before Sun Life moved its HQ from Quebec to Ontario in 1976, after the election of the first PQ government. 

Sun Life moved its global headquarters from 150 King to the newly named Sun Life Financial Tower at One York in Toronto's South Core district in 2017. 

Sun Life retains ownership over 150 King Street West and has leased the roughly 150,000 square feet of space it vacated.

Towers 
Located at the corner of King Street West and University Avenue, the taller East Tower is in the Financial District while the slightly shorter West Tower is located in the area known as the Entertainment District.

The top floor of East tower, as well as space on 16th and 25th floor is occupied by the St. Andrew's Club and Conference Centre and provides excellent views of the city. The Sun Life Centre is connected to Toronto's PATH system and the two towers share an underground connection to St. Andrew Subway Station.

In 2010, the Sun Life Centre was awarded LEED Gold certification under the Canada Green Building Council's LEED for Existing Buildings: Operations & Maintenance green building rating system.

Management 
150 King Street West is managed by Sun Life's asset management subsidiary BentallGreenOak.

References

External links

PATH (Toronto)
Office buildings completed in 1984
Skyscrapers in Toronto
Twin towers
WZMH Architects buildings
Head
Skyscraper office buildings in Canada